The office of High Sheriff is over 1000 years old, with its establishment before the Norman Conquest. The Office of High Sheriff remained first in precedence in the counties until the reign of Edward VII when an Order in Council in 1908 gave the Lord-Lieutenant the prime office under the Crown as the Sovereign's personal representative. The High Sheriff remains the Sovereign's representative in the County for all matters relating to the Judiciary and the maintenance of law and order.

The county of Avon was formed in 1974 and abolished in 1996.  Before and after this time the area covered was in a variety of other shrievalties, including Somerset, Bristol and Gloucestershire.

Officeholders
1974: Hugh Charles Innes Rogers, of Beach House, Bitton, near Bristol.
1975: John Foster Robinson, CBE, TD, of St. Georges Hill, Easton-in-Gordano, near Bristol.
1976: Simon Melville Wills, of The Manor House, Walton-in-Gordano, Clevedon.
1977: Malcolm Allinson Anson, of Hill Court, Congresbury, Bristol.
1978: Humphrey Ashley Densham, OBE, of 15 Eaton Crecent, Clifton, Bristol.
1979: Thomas Lloyd Robinson, TD, of Lechlade, 23 Druid Stoke Avenue, Stoke Bishop, Bristol.
1980: Mary Ada Phoebe Towill, of Urchinwood Manor, Congresbury, Bristol.
1981: Roderick Macdonald Davidson, of 13 Buckingham Vale, Clifton, Bristol.
1982: Peter Douglas Smith, of Westbrook, Flax Bourton, Bristol.
1983: Colonel Charles James Stewart, OBE, TD, of Thornton, Midford Road, Combe Down, Bath.
1984: Christopher Wilson Thomas CBE, of Bourne House
1985: Robert Edward John Bernays, of Old Down House, Tockington
1986: Sir Alexander Walter Merrison FRS, of The Manor, Hinton Blewett
1987: Robert Alexander Chermside, of The Old Rectory, Tormarton
1988: Charles Richard Thurlow Laws, of Jerome House
1989: Sir George White, 4th Baronet, of Pypers
1990: Robert Foxcroft Robertson-Glasgow, of Hinton House, Hinton Charterhouse, near Bath.
1991: Andrew Milton Reid, of Parsonage Farm, Publow, Pensford, Bristol.
1992: Francis William Greenacre, of 3 Cecil Road, Clifton, Bristol.
1993: Hylton Henry Bayntun-Coward
1994: Christopher Marsden-Smedley, of Church Farm, Burrington, Bristol.
1995: James Napier Tidmarsh, MBE, of 8 Princes Buildings, Clifton, Bristol.
1996: George Robert Paget Ferguson, of 5 Windsor Terrace, Clifton, Bristol.

References

 
Avon